Antonio Crispo (died 1584) was a governor of the Duchy of the Archipelago between 1544 and 1554. He was the son of William Crispo (or Guglielmo; - 1555) and his unknown wife, and paternal grandson of Antonio Crispo.

He married a lady of the noble Greek Gavalas family from Rhodes, without issue.

References
 

1584 deaths
People from the Duchy of the Archipelago
Antonio 03
People from the Cyclades
Year of birth unknown